Dolno Lakočerej is a village in the municipality of Ohrid, North Macedonia.

Demographics
According to the 2002 census, the village had a total of 728 inhabitants. Ethnic groups in the village include:

Macedonians 727
Serbs 1

References

Villages in Ohrid Municipality